George Bould (23 March 1887 – 1958) was an English footballer who played in the Football League for Wolverhampton Wanderers.

References

1887 births
1958 deaths
English footballers
Association football forwards
English Football League players
Wolverhampton Wanderers F.C. players
Darlaston Town F.C. players
Bilston Town F.C. players